Mary Elizabeth Marquis  is a former leading interviewer and presenter on BBC Scotland from the mid-1960s, and became the face of the network's evening news programme Reporting Scotland until 1988, including the whole of the 1970s Nationwide era when input from BBC broadcasters based at the corporation's other studios around the UK contributed to a national programme.

Early life
Marquis was born in Glasgow. She trained at the Royal Scottish Academy of Music and Drama in Glasgow.

Career
She joined Border TV as an in-vision continuity announcer and presenter in 1961. She was the first person seen on screen at Border, opening the station's transmission with the words "Good evening and welcome to Border Television" when it went on air for the first time at 5:45pm on Friday 1 September 1961.

Two years later she moved to BBC Scotland, travelling all over Scotland to interview people for A Quick Look Round (and later for her own series First Person Singular from 1970 – 75), before becoming one of the three lead presenters of Reporting Scotland at its inception in 1968, and subsequently, the programme's main anchor for most of the next twenty years. With the start of Nationwide in 1969, she became a frequent face on television across the whole of the UK.

Marquis left Reporting Scotland to become one of the first presenters of Good Morning Scotland and stand-in as anchor of BBC Radio 4's Today programme but later returned to television news at BBC Scotland in September 1975, continuing as anchor of Reporting Scotland until her departure from the BBC in 1988.

She has subsequently been involved with various arts, medical and academic organisations, and also did a series of live interviews at the Edinburgh Festival. She was appointed Member of the Order of the British Empire in the 1983 New Year Honours list, and honoured with a special award for 'Special Contribution to Scottish Broadcasting' at the 2007 Scottish BAFTA awards.

RCS awards an annual Mary Marquis prize for student performance in television, commemorating her time there.

Personal life 
In 1962 she married Jack Anderson, a Glasgow (subsequently also Canada and London)-based architect and lecturer, and a son David was born two years later.  Although expecting to be dismissed, she continued to appear on screen almost until the birth (including one interview conducted on a roof), and was back in the studio afterwards within six weeks.

References

External links
 Title sequences for Reporting Scotland, TV ark.  Including a 1985 version, seguing to Mary Marquis at the news desk
 Mary Marquis attempting to feed the penguins at Edinburgh Zoo (film clip), BBC News Scotland website
 Reported Scotland: 50 Years of BBC TV News, 60-minute BBC Scotland film, shown 30 September 2007. YouTube copy.

Living people
BBC Scotland newsreaders and journalists
Members of the Order of the British Empire
Mass media people from Glasgow
Scots language activists
Scottish television presenters
Scottish women television presenters
Year of birth missing (living people)
British women television journalists
Scottish radio presenters
Scottish women radio presenters